Shaun Patrick Micallef (born 18 July 1962) is an Australian comedian, actor, writer and television presenter. He is currently the host of the satirical news comedy series Shaun Micallef's Mad as Hell on the ABC. He also hosted the game show Talkin' 'Bout Your Generation on Channel 10.

Micallef first gained recognition as a cast member of the sketch comedy show Full Frontal, which led to his own sketch show, The Micallef P(r)ogram(me), the sitcom Welcher & Welcher and the variety show Micallef Tonight. He then hosted the satirical news comedy series Newstopia on SBS, the game show Talkin' 'Bout Your Generation on Network Ten, and Shaun Micallef's Mad as Hell on ABC TV. He also co-created and starred in Mr & Mrs Murder on Network Ten.

In addition to his television work Micallef has appeared on stage, most notably in a revival of The Odd Couple (2016) for the Melbourne Theatre Company and on radio as the co-host of Melbourne station Vega 91.5's morning program.  He is also the author of several books: Smithereens (2004), Preincarnate (2010), The President's Desk (2014), Tales from a Tall Forest (2017), The Uncollected Plays of Shaun Micallef (2018), Mad as Hell and Back (2019), Happily Ever Afterwards (2021) and Tripping Over Myself, a memoir (2022).

Early life and education
Micallef was born in Adelaide, South Australia, and is of Maltese and Irish descent. His father worked for a company that sold parts for Volvos and his mother was employed at the Adelaide Bank.

As a child, Micallef lived in Clovelly Park and attended St Bernadette's School in St Marys then St Joseph's Catholic School in Mitchell Park (now Sacred Heart College Middle School) before moving on to Sacred Heart Senior College where he was the College Captain.

Micallef studied law at the University of Adelaide, where he was frequently involved in comedy revues, often involving Francis Greenslade and Gary McCaffrie, with whom he continues to work.

Influences
Micallef was influenced by the Goons, Peter Sellers, Marx Brothers, S. J. Perelman, James Thurber, Spike Milligan, Barry Humphries, Frank Muir, Monty Python and Woody Allen.

Career

Early theatre
In 1972, having three younger sisters taking ballet classes, ten-year-old Micallef was often asked to help out when a dance routine required a boy. The following year he auditioned for the Bunyip Children's Theatre and over the next four years participated in plays that they performed in the Scott Theatre during school holidays. In 1976 he doubled for Humphrey B. Bear for personal appearances.

Legal career
Micallef was a practising solicitor for ten years in the field of insurance law before making the decision to move to Melbourne and pursue a full-time career in comedy in 1993.

He relates the story that, while working as a solicitor, he talked so much about making a career change and becoming a comedian that his wife Leandra gave him an ultimatum: she marked a date on a calendar and told him to quit his job and become a comedian by that date or never talk about it again.

Television and film
Following early TV appearances on Theatre Sports (1987) and The Big Gig (1989), in early 1993 Micallef was offered a job writing for the Jimeoin show which was soon followed by an offer to also write for the sketch comedy show Full Frontal where six months later he took on the role as co-producer with Gary McCaffrie. In 1994, Micallef became a full-time cast member of Full Frontal, where he became well known for characters such as Milo Kerrigan, Nobby Doldrums and a send-up of Italian male model Fabio. Micallef recalls that the show was a good introduction to television comedy because, with an ensemble cast, its success did not hinge on his performance and he had more freedom to make and learn from mistakes. However, he was frustrated with the lack of control he had over his work in the series as well as the repetition of characters and gags.

Micallef's role on Full Frontal led to a 1996 special Shaun Micallef's World Around Him and three seasons of the two-time Logie Award-winning ABC series The Micallef Program (1998–2001), which he co-wrote and produced with long-time writing partner Gary McCaffrie. Since the series' end he has created and starred in two short-lived television series, the sitcom Welcher & Welcher (2003) and the variety show Micallef Tonight (2003), and devised a series of telemovies, BlackJack (2003–present).

Micallef has also had acting roles in the television series SeaChange (2000), Through My Eyes (2004) and Offspring (2010) as well as supporting roles in the films Bad Eggs (2003), The Honourable Wally Norman (2003), The Extra (2005), Aquamarine (2006) and The King (2007). In 2006, he was a recurring guest on the Network Ten Improvisational theatre show Thank God You're Here.

In 2007, along with partners McCaffrie and Michael Ward, Micallef developed the satirical comedy program Newstopia, which he hosted. In 2009, Micallef joined the Ten Network and hosted Talkin' 'Bout Your Generation, which aired for four seasons.

He co-created Mr & Mrs Murder, a crime comedy television series for Channel Ten which aired in 2013, and starred in the lead role of Charlie Buchanan alongside Kat Stewart. Also that year, Micallef signed on to voice the artificially intelligent robot RE3F in the Australian feature length science fiction film Arrowhead (2014).

Micallef hosted Shaun Micallef's Mad as Hell  for 10 years and 15 series on the ABC from 2012 until 2022. Micallef also hosted a two-season reboot of Talkin' Bout Your Generation for Channel Nine (2018-2019) and the game show Shaun Micallef's Brain Eisteddfod which premiered on Channel 10 on 20 July 2022, running for 10 weeks.

In 2022 he performed in a celebrity tribute to Australian comedian and actor Paul Hogan, Roast of Paul Hogan, which was broadcast on Australia's Seven Network.

Other work
In September 2005, Micallef began hosting the breakfast show "Shaun, Beverley and Denise" on Melbourne radio station Vega 91.5 FM with comedian Denise Scott and television presenter Beverley O'Connor. In July 2006, comedian Dave O'Neil took over as host and the show was renamed "Dave and Denise with Shaun Micallef". Micallef left the network on 23 November 2007.

Micallef released a book, Smithereens, which was published in 2004 and contains a collection of prose, poetry and plays. He describes it as a collection of "all sorts of bits and pieces I have written". His second book, a novella titled Preincarnate, was released in 2010.

In October 2014, Micallef released his third book, The President's Desk: An Alt-History of the United States; a semi-fictitious history, told from the perspective of the Resolute desk.

Shaun published an autobiography in 2022, Tripping Over Myself, A Memoir of a Life in Comedy.

Personal life
Born to teetotaling parents, Micallef began drinking alcohol at age 18, and became a teetotaller in 1986, although he did consume alcoholic beverages for a scientific test featured on Shaun Micallef's On The Sauce. He lives in Williamstown, Victoria, with his wife Leandra, whom he married in 1989, and their three sons.

List of works

Films
 Bad Eggs (2003) – Premier Cray
 The Honourable Wally Norman (2003) – Ken Oats
 The 13th House (2003) – Sir
 The Extra (2005) – Paul Ridley
 Aquamarine (2006) – Storm Banks
 The King (2007) – Colin Bednall
 The Cup (2011) – Lee Freedman
 Arrowhead (2014) – RE3F (voice)

Television
The Big Gig (1989) (writer)
Jimeoin (1994) – various (also writer)
Full Frontal (1994–1997) – various (also writer and producer)
The Glynn Nicholas Show (1996) (writer)
Shaun Micallef's World Around Him (1996) – various (also writer and producer)
The Micallef Program (1998–2001) – various (also writer and producer)
SeaChange (2000) – Warwick Munro
Welcher & Welcher (2003) – Quentin Welcher (also writer and producer)
Micallef Tonight (2003) – himself (also writer)
BlackJack (2003–2007) (writer)
Through My Eyes (2005) – Jack Winneke
Thank God You're Here (2006–2007) – various (semi-regular guest)
Dogstar (2007) – narrator
Newstopia (2007–2008) – himself
Talkin' 'Bout Your Generation (2009–2012, 2018–2019) – host
Melbourne International Comedy Festival (2009) – host
Offspring (2010) – Lachlan
Laid (2011–2012) – G-Bomb
The Bazura Project's Guide To Sinema (2011) – MK-Ultra (voice)
Mollusks (2011) – Easty (voice)
Shaun Micallef's Mad as Hell (2012–2022) – host
Mr & Mrs Murder (2013) – Charlie Buchanan
Danger 5 (2012, 2014) – Principal
Shaun Micallef's Stairway to Heaven (2014) – himself
The Ex-PM (2015-2017) – Andrew Dugdale
Shaun Micallef's On The Sauce (2020) – himself
Shaun Micallef's Brain Eisteddfod (2022) – himself

Theatre
Boeing Boeing (2008) – Bernard
Good Evening – Sketches from Dudley Moore and Peter Cook (2010)
The Odd Couple (2016)

Radio shows
Dave and Denise with Shaun Micallef on Vega 91.5 FM (2005–2007)
The Comedy Crystal Set – Adelaide University Radio, co-host

Books
Smithereens (2004)
Preincarnate (2010)
The President's Desk (2014)
Tales from a Tall Forest (2017)
The Uncollected Plays of Shaun Micallef (2018)
Mad as Hell and Back: Silver Jubilee of Sketches, co-written with Gary McCaffrie (2019)
Happily Ever Afterwards: A Tale From a Taller Forest (2021)
Tripping Over Myself (2022)

DVD/Audio
The Micallef P(r)ogram(me) s.2 (2004, DVD)
The Micallef P(r)ogram(me) s.3 (2005, DVD)
The Micallef P(r)ogram(me) s.1 (2006, DVD)
The Expurgated Micallef Tonight: The Very Best of Shaun Micallef's Short-Lived but Brilliant Tonight Show (2008, DVD)
His Generation (2009, CD)
Micallef in a Box (2010, 4DVD/1CD) – collection of the above

Awards

ARIA Music Awards
The ARIA Music Awards are a set of annual ceremonies presented by Australian Recording Industry Association (ARIA), which recognise excellence, innovation, and achievement across all genres of the music of Australia. They commenced in 1987.

! 
|-
| 2008 || The Expurgated Micallef Tonight || ARIA Award for Best Comedy Release ||  || 
|-

AACTA Awards
2010: AACTA Award for Outstanding Achievement in Television Screencraft (Talkin' 'Bout Your Generation)
2013: AACTA Award for Best Comedy Series (Mad as Hell s.2)
2013: AACTA Award for Best Performance in a Television Comedy (Mad as Hell s.2)
2015: AACTA Award for Best Comedy Series (Mad as Hell s.3/4)
2016: Logie Award for Most Outstanding Comedy Program (Mad as Hell s.5)
2020: AACTA Award for Best Comedy Entertainment Program (Mad as Hell s.12)

GQ Men of the Year
2012: GQ Men of the Year Awards (Comedian of the Year)

Logie Awards
2000: Logie Awards: Most Outstanding Comedy Program for the Micallef P(r)ogram(me) s.2
2002: Logie Awards: Most Outstanding Comedy Program for the Micallef P(r)ogram(me) s.3
2010: Logie Awards: Most Popular Presenter (Won); Gold Logie (nominated) for Talkin' 'Bout Your Generation

References

External links

ShaunMicallefOnline.com fansite
ShaunMicallef.com fansite (archived)

1962 births
ARIA Award winners
Australian male comedians
Australian male film actors
Australian people of Irish descent
Australian people of Maltese descent
Australian solicitors
Australian television presenters
Comedians from Melbourne
Lawyers from Adelaide
Living people
Logie Award winners
People from Williamstown, Victoria
Talkin' 'Bout Your Generation
Adelaide Law School alumni
People educated at Sacred Heart College, Adelaide